Adenothamnus is a genus of flowering plants in the family Asteraceae described as a genus in 1935.

There is only one known species, Adenothamnus validus, endemic to the Baja California Peninsula in Mexico.

References

Madieae
Endemic flora of Mexico
Flora of Baja California
Monotypic Asteraceae genera